Iglesia conventual del Carmen is a church located in San Fernando in the Province of Cádiz, Andalusia, Spain.

See also
Roman Catholic Diocese of Cádiz y Ceuta

References

Churches in San Fernando, Cádiz